The Right to Sex (published as The Right to Sex: Feminism in the Twenty-First Century in the United States) is a 2021 collection of non-fiction feminist essays by Amia Srinivasan.

Summary
Srinivasan states that The Right to Sex "is a book of feminist essays – on rape and racial oppression, pornography and the internet, sex work and carceralism, pleasure and power, sex and pedagogy, the ethics of sexual desire, and sex and the state." Topics covered include the effect of systemic prejudice and patriarchal expectations on sexual desire, the reinforcement of such standards by a lack of criticism and online pornography, and the consequences of poorly-applied intersectionality and reliance on incarceration.

Reception
The book has six "positive" reviews, nine "rave" reviews, four "mixed" reviews, and one "pan" review according to review aggregator Book Marks.

References

2021 non-fiction books
English-language books
Farrar, Straus and Giroux books